Lois Martha Roberts ( – ) was an Australian murder victim, whose death near Nimbin, New South Wales in 1998 remains unsolved.

Background
Roberts was the daughter of Pastor Frank Roberts, a minister with the Church of Christ and an Aboriginal activist, and Muriel Roberts. She was the twin sister of the arts administrator and broadcaster Rhoda Roberts AO, and the sister of Philip and Mark. Brought up and educated in the Lismore region in northern New South Wales, Roberts trained as a hairdresser until, at age 20, she was seriously injured in a car accident sustaining permanent brain damage. She was rehabilitated sufficiently to care for herself and went to live on her own near Lismore. Subsequently, she had two children who were raised by her mother and twin sister.

Disappearance
Roberts was last seen outside Nimbin Police Station on 31 July 1998. It would appear that she was abducted while hitch-hiking between Nimbin and Lismore and then tortured and abused before being killed. Her badly mutilated body was found about six months after her disappearance in January 1999. A bushwalker found the remains in Whian Whian State Forest, near Dunoon, deep in thick bush some way off a fire trail.

Investigation and aftermath
The perpetrator or perpetrators of the crime have never been identified. An inquest was held in June 2002. The senior stipendiary magistrate of the Lismore Court Circuit, Jeff Linden, sitting as a coroner returned an open finding after a two-week hearing.

See also
Bowraville Murders
List of solved missing persons cases
List of unsolved murders

References

External links
 Death Of Lois Martha Roberts - speech by The Hon. Janelle Saffin in the Parliament of New South Wales 12 May 1999
 A Sister's Love - documentary (2006) by Ivan Sen
 Interview with Rhoda Roberts - Life Matters ABC Radio National (audio download available)
 Roberts faces her sister’s tragedy - article from Byron Bay Echo September 2007
 Web page about the documentary, A Sister's Love.
 Dirty Little Secrets unsolved murder series - series of articles by Kate Kachor for Nine News in 2017

1990s missing person cases
Australian murder victims
Deaths by person in Australia
Formerly missing people
Missing person cases in Australia
Unsolved murders in Australia